Destroy may refer to:
 Destroy (album), a 2004 album by Ektomorf
 Destroy!, a Minneapolis Crust punk band
 Destroy!!, a comic book by Scott McCloud

See also 
 Destroyer (disambiguation)
 Destruction (disambiguation)
 Destroy 2, a short-lived Japanese noise punk band